The Federal Ministry for the Environment, Nature Conservation, Nuclear Safety and Consumer Protection, abbreviated BMUV, is a cabinet-level ministry of the Federal Republic of Germany. It has branches in Bonn and Berlin.

The ministry was established on 6 June 1986 in response to the Chernobyl disaster. The then Federal Government wanted to combine environmental authority under a new minister in order to face new environmental challenges more effectively. Furthermore The Greens had been formed a few years prior in part as an anti-nuclear environmentalist party and had achieved federal representation in 1983 and Joschka Fischer had been appointed minister of the environment for Hesse the previous year, marking the first state level red-green coalition in Germany. Thus the CDU/CSU intended to project a message of taking the environment seriously in an era in which the Greens were widely perceived as the only party with a policy focus on environmental issues, notwithstanding the fact that CSU-led Bavaria had had a state environment minister since 1971 and the FDP was the first to pass an environment-related plank in the party platform in 1971. Prior to the establishment of the ministry of the environment, responsibilities for environmental issues were distributed among the ministries of the Interior, Agriculture and Health.

Functions
The ministry's primary functions include:

 Fundamental national environmental policy
 Informing and educating the public about environmental issues
 Environmental remediation and development in Eastern Germany
 Climate protection and energy
 Air quality control
 Noise abatement
 Conservation of groundwater, rivers, lakes and seas
 Soil conservation and remediation of contaminated sites
 Waste management and recycling policy
 Chemicals safety, environment and health
 Precautions against emergencies in industrial plants
 Protection, maintenance and sustainable utilization of biodiversity
 Safety of nuclear facilities
 Nuclear supply and disposal
 Radiological protection

Organization
The ministry is led by the Minister for the Environment, Nature Conservation and Nuclear Safety. The current Minister is Steffi Lemke, appointed by Chancellor Olaf Scholz. The minister is supported by two parliamentary state secretaries (members of the cabinet and federal government, "deputy ministers") and two career state secretaries (public servants) who manage the ministry's nine directorates:
 
"Z" directorate (Abteilung Z) is the central office responsible for internal affairs
 "G" directorate (Abteilung G) is the central office responsible for policy and collaboration
"KI" directorate (Abteilung KI): climate and international cooperation
"S" directorate (Abteilung S): radiation protection, nuclear safety, nuclear supply and radioactive waste
"WR" directorate (Abteilung WR): water management, waste management, soil conservation and contamination
"IG" directorate (Abteilung IG): air pollution, health impacts, environment and traffic, hazardous locations and materials
"N" directorate (Abteilung N): conservation und species richness, genetic engineering, environmental impacts of agriculture and forestry

Federal Environment Ministers
Political Party:

See also
Bundesamt für Strahlenschutz
List of German ministers of the environment
 Nuclear phase-out#Germany
 Nuclear power in Germany
World Nuclear Industry Status Report

References

External links
Official Web site (German)
Official Web site (English)

Environment, Nature Conservation, Nuclear Safety and Consumer Protection
Environment of Germany
Germany, Environment, Nature Conservation, Nuclear Safety and Consumer Protection
Germany, Environment, Nature Conservation, Nuclear Safety and Consumer Protection
Germany, Environment, Nature Conservation, Nuclear Safety and Consumer Protection
Germany, Environment, Nature Conservation, Nuclear Safety and Consumer Protection
1986 establishments in West Germany
Radiation protection organizations